Film Farm India is a production house based in Mumbai. It produces Indian soap operas for various channels like Zee TV and Colors TV. It is founded and established in 2004 by Pintoo and Rupali Guha.

Productions

Upcoming broadcasts 
|} classic "wikitable" style=" 
!Year 
!Serial 
!Channel 
!Ref
|- 
|2023-Upcoming 
|Wasita paraman-Naya Zindagi Krishna 
|Sony Sab
|
|}

Awards

References

External links
 Official Website

Companies based in Mumbai
Television production companies of India
Entertainment companies of India
Entertainment companies established in 2004
Mass media companies established in 2004
Indian companies established in 2004
2004 establishments in Maharashtra